Sphingopyxis ummariensis is a bacterium. It is Gram-negative, motile, rod-shaped and yellow-pigmented. The type strain is UI2T (=CCM 7428T =MTCC 8591T).

References

External links 
LPSN
Type strain of Sphingopyxis ummariensis at BacDive -  the Bacterial Diversity Metadatabase

Sphingomonadales
Bacteria described in 2010